Tikhomirov may refer to:

Tikhomirov (crater), a crater on the Moon 
Tikhomirov Scientific Research Institute of Instrument Design
Tikhomirov (surname), people with the surname Tikhomirov